Juniperus macrocarpa (large-fruited juniper, syn. J. oxycedrus subsp. macrocarpa (Sibth. & Sm.)

It is dioecious, with separate male and female plants. The seed cones are berry-like, green ripening in 18 months to orange-red with a variable pink waxy coating; they are spherical, 12–18 mm diameter, and have six fused scales in two whorls, three of the scales with a single seed. The seeds are dispersed when birds eat the cones, digesting the fleshy scales and passing the hard seeds in their droppings. The pollen cones are yellow, 2–3 mm long, and fall soon after shedding their pollen in late winter.

Despite its distinct morphology with large cones and broad leaves more like those of Juniperus drupacea, it has often been treated as a subspecies of Juniperus oxycedrus, though recent genetic studies have shown its DNA is distinct from that of J. oxycedrus.

References

macrocarpa
Trees of Mediterranean climate
Trees of Europe
Trees of Turkey
Flora of Cyprus
Dioecious plants
Flora of the Mediterranean Basin